Henrik "Hinke" Bergegren (1861–1936) was a Swedish socialist, anarchist, writer, and agitator.

References 

 

1861 births
1936 deaths
Swedish Social Democratic Party politicians
Swedish communists
Swedish Comintern people
Swedish anarchists
Anarcho-syndicalists